Ward Jackson Park is a municipal park located in Hartlepool, England. It is named after Ralph Ward Jackson, a local industrialist, who founded West Hartlepool in the 19th century. In later life, Ward Jackson encountered financial difficulties and a fund was established to help him out in his old age. In view of his sudden death, the money collected was used to create a public park.

The park contains a small children's playground, pond with various bird visitors, band stand, fountain and a cafeteria as well as open green space.

History
The park was established in 1883 in memory of the founder of West Hartlepool, Ralph Ward Jackson (1806–1880). The land for the park was purchased by a Mr Wooler of Sandberge Hall near Darlington. The  site was purchased by public subscription,  being donated by Wooler himself. The lodge house dates from 1883, the bandstand and the fountain from 1901 and the clock tower at the Grange Road entrance from 1923.

The park lies on a gently undulating site which had been agricultural land known as Old Cow Pasture belong to Tunstall Hall which lies to the south-west. A competition for the park's design was won by the architect T.W. Helliwell and the landscape gardener Lister Kershaw but in order to save money, the development was finally assigned to Matthew Scott. It is bounded on the east by Park Avenue, on the west and south by Elwick Road and to the north by private home.

Development and facilities
The south-eastern entrance leads in to a lodge (1883) designed by Henry Suggitt and Son, while the north east entrance at the western end of Grange Road is flanked by a brick clock tower with stone details and inscribed "The gift of Alderman John Brown, J P Mayor 1902-3-4. In consideration for others 1921". The tennis and quoit area from the late 1890s in the south-east corner was replaced by a hard tennis court in the 1930s. The rose garden from 1952 was extended in 1979. The park bell to the south of the rose garder was installed around 1924. The bowling green in the north-east corner was added in 1913. The bandstand to the west of the bowling green was presented by Sir William Gray in 1900. The park's lake with an island to the north west was expanded from a small existing pond. It is bordered by an elaborate cast-iron fountain completed in 1902 to commemorate Queen Victoria's diamond jubilee.

References 

Hartlepool
Parks and open spaces in County Durham